Jerry Pittman (born November 19, 1936) is an American professional golfer.

Pittman grew up in Tulsa, Oklahoma. He played college golf at Southern Methodist University.

Pittman played on the PGA Tour from 1960 to 1970. His best finish was T-5 at the 1962 Greater New Orleans Open Invitational. His best finishes in the majors were a pair of T-7s in 1968: at the Masters and at the U.S. Open.

Pittman was the club pro at Seminole Golf Club in West Palm Beach, Florida from 1973 to 2000.

Professional wins
1964 Oklahoma Open
1965 Metropolitan Open, Metropolitan PGA Championship
1968 Metropolitan Open, Long Island Open

References

American male golfers
SMU Mustangs men's golfers
PGA Tour golfers
Golfers from Oklahoma
Golfers from Florida
Sportspeople from Tulsa, Oklahoma
1936 births
Living people